Melanie Moore (born September 17, 1991) is an American professional dancer and actress best known as the winner of the eighth season of the U.S. reality television competition So You Think You Can Dance. According to the results announced on the broadcast, Moore won "overwhelmingly", garnering 47% of the vote in a four-way final tally.

Early life and education 
Moore was educated in Marietta, Georgia, where she attended Lassiter High School and was crowned homecoming queen. At the time of the SYTYCD competition, she was a 19-year-old college freshman attending Fordham University at Lincoln Center in New York City. Moore trained and competed for twelve years at Centre Stage School of Dance, followed by training at Rhythm Dance Center, both located in Marietta. Moore won the National JUMP Senior Female VIP.

Career 
Moore appeared on the Oxygen TV show All the Right Moves as a member of the Shaping Sound Dance Company. She also appeared on the fourth season of Glee, as a dance pupil enrolled at NYADA.

In 2015, Moore originated the role of Peter Pan in Finding Neverland on Broadway at the Lunt-Fontanne Theater., and was nominated for the Fred and Adele Astaire "Best Female Dancer" Award for her work in the role. She played the role of Chava in the 2015 Broadway revival of Fiddler on the Roof until the show closed on December 31, 2016. She appeared in the 2017 Broadway revival of Hello Dolly! as Ermengarde through the end of the show's run in August 2018. In 2022 she joined the touring cast of To Kill a Mockingbird playing Scout Finch opposite Richard Thomas.

References

1991 births
Living people
American contemporary dancers
So You Think You Can Dance (American TV series) contestants
21st-century American dancers

de:Melanie Moore